TWELVE Hotels & Residences at Third Ward was a proposed 39 story skyscraper in Charlotte, North Carolina, USA. If built, it would have been located at the intersection of South Mint and West 2nd Streets.

See also
List of tallest buildings in Charlotte

References

Residential skyscrapers in Charlotte, North Carolina
Skyscraper hotels in Charlotte, North Carolina